Northwick may refer to the following places in England:

 Northwick, a hamlet near Blockley, Gloucestershire (formerly in Worcestershire), now the site of Northwick Park, Gloucestershire
 Northwick, South Gloucestershire, a hamlet near Pilning in South Gloucestershire
 Northwick, Worcestershire, a village near Worcester
 Northwick Park, a district of Greater London
 Northwick Park Hospital
 Northwick Park tube station, a London Underground station

See also
 Northwich, Cheshire, England